Titanoeca americana is a species of true spider in the family Titanoecidae. It is found in North America.

References

External links

 

Titanoecidae
Articles created by Qbugbot
Spiders described in 1888